Aroma Park (formerly Waldron) is a village in Kankakee County, Illinois, United States, along the Kankakee River opposite the mouth of the Iroquois River. Aroma Park is a suburb of the city of Kankakee. Aroma Park's population was 743 at the 2010 census, down from 821 at the 2000 census. It is included in the Kankakee-Bradley, Illinois Metropolitan Statistical Area.

Geography
Aroma Park is located in southern Kankakee County at  (41.078981, -87.805363).

Demographics

As of the census of 2000, there were 821 people, 308 households, and 222 families residing in the village. The racial makeup of the village was 92.57% White, 4.26% African American, 0.12% Native American, 2.07% from other races, and 0.97% from two or more races. Hispanic or Latino of any race were 6.82% of the population.

There were 308 households, out of which 31.2% had children under the age of 18 living with them, 59.7% were married couples living together, 8.8% had a female householder with no husband present, and 27.9% were non-families. 22.7% of all households were made up of individuals, and 10.1% had someone living alone who was 65 years of age or older. The average household size was 2.58 and the average family size was 3.06.

In the village, the population was spread out, with 25.0% under the age of 18, 8.0% from 18 to 24, 27.0% from 25 to 44, 25.7% from 45 to 64, and 14.3% who were 65 years of age or older. The median age was 39 years. For every 100 females, there were 102.7 males. For every 100 females age 18 and over, there were 102.0 males.

The median income for a household in the village was $41,375, and the median income for a family was $44,667. Males had a median income of $33,750 versus $24,583 for females. The per capita income for the village was $17,806. About 6.6% of families and 6.9% of the population were below the poverty line, including 9.1% of those under age 18 and 7.8% of those age 65 or over.

Facts
 In 1995, the Aroma Park Little League All-Stars won the state championship, becoming the smallest town ever to do so.
 During the making of Steve McQueen's final movie The Hunter, scenes of the river house were filmed at the junction of the Kankakee and Iroquois rivers, on the southern edge of Aroma Park, just north of the Aroma Park Boat Club.

References

External links
Official website

Villages in Kankakee County, Illinois
Villages in Illinois